The 11th Indiana Zouaves (officially, "11th Regiment, Indiana Volunteer Infantry") was an infantry regiment that served in the Union Army during the American Civil War.

Service

3 Month
The 11th Indiana was enlisted in Indianapolis, Indiana, to serve 90 days, with Lew Wallace as its colonel and George McGinnis as lieutenant colonel. The regiment was sent to western Virginia and saw only minimal action during a raid on the town of Romney. It then returned to Indianapolis to be mustered out as its enlistment had expired.

3 Year
The 11th Indiana was reorganized in Indianapolis with Wallace and McGinnis returning as colonel and lieutenant colonel. Wallace trained the 11th Indiana in Zouave tactics and the regiment became known as Wallace's Zouaves. The uniform consisted of a grey jacket with red trimming, a grey kepi with red braiding, a dark blue zouave vest, and grey pantaloons. Later they received a new uniform consisting of a black zouave jacket with skyblue trimming, a red kepi with a dark blue band, and sky blue pantaloons.  The regiment was sent to Paducah, Kentucky and from there joined Ulysses S. Grant's expedition against Fort Henry. Before they went into action, Wallace was promoted to brigadier general and McGinnis became the regiment's colonel. McGinnis led the regiment at Fort Henry, Fort Donelson and Shiloh. After Shiloh, McGinnis was promoted to brigadier general and Daniel Macauley became regimental colonel. Macauley led the regiment during the Vicksburg Campaign and the subsequent siege of Vicksburg.

After the fall of Vicksburg, the 11th Indiana was transferred for duty in the Department of the Gulf. In July, 1864 the regiment was ordered to Washington, DC and joined Philip Sheridan's Army of the Shenandoah. With Macauley in command the regiment fought at the battles of Opequon, Fisher's Hill and Cedar Creek. It remained on garrison duty in the Shenandoah Valley until it was mustered out on July 26, 1865.

Legacy
The USL franchise, Indy Eleven, was named specifically for the 11th Indiana Infantry.

See also

 List of Indiana Civil War regiments
 Indiana in the Civil War

Notes

Literature
Patrick, Jeffrey L. 2003. Three Years with Wallace's Zouaves: The Civil War Memoirs of Thomas Wise Durham. Macon, GA: Mercer University Press.

External links
The Civil War Archive - Indiana Units
Civil War - Indiana

Military units and formations established in 1861
Military units and formations disestablished in 1861
Units and formations of the Union Army from Indiana
1861 establishments in Indiana